The 2016 Pan American Surf Games, also referred to as PASA Games 2016 and officially named 2016 Claro Open Pan American Surfing Games for sponsorship reasons, was the twelfth edition of the Pan American Surf Games, the main competition organized by the Pan American Surf Association. It was held at Punta Roquitas beach in Miraflores District, Lima, Peru from 10 to 16 October 2016.

About 260 athletes from 12 national teams competes in 13 surfing events; comprising Open (Shortboard), Longboard, SUP surf, SUP race, Bodyboard prone and Paddleboard race each for men and women, plus a Bodyboard dropknee event only for men.

Defending champions Peru won the competition for the third time with a total of 13,825 points and 9 out of the 13 gold medals at stake. Chile finished second with 11,980 points and 2 gold medals. Ecuador (8,628 points) and Mexico (8,507 points and 1 gold medal) were third and fourth respectively.

Schedule
The games were held over a 7-day period, from 10 to 16 December. The opening ceremony took place on 10 October, with the competitions starting on 11 October.

Participating nations
12 out of the 26 national associations affiliated to Pan American Surf Association entered the competition.

Medal table

Results

Men's events

Women's events

Final ranking per teams
The final ranking per teams was drawn up by adding the individual points earning by the best four surfers in the men's Open event, the best two surfers in the women's Open event and the best surfer in the remaining 11 events. Surfers obtained points according to the final position they occupied in each event.

Non-initiators and non-finishers surfers received zero points. Points awarded according to the position were as follows:

The first place of the final ranking per teams was declared as the champion team of the 2016 Pan American Surf Games.

External links
Final results summary

References

Pan American Surf Games